8th & Ocean is an American reality series about a group of models living in Miami, Florida that premiered on MTV on March 7, 2006. The series aired for ten episodes, ending its run on May 9, 2006. The creators of 8th & Ocean are also responsible for Laguna Beach, a show also airing on MTV. The theme song for the show is "Beautiful Love" by the Christian rock band the Afters.

Synopsis
The show followed the lives of ten male and female fashion models from Irene Marie Models living together in Miami's South Beach area. The name is derived from the location of the agency (near the intersection located at 8th Street and Ocean Drive in South Beach).

Cast

Britt and twins Kelly and Sabrina were featured in Maxim'''s Hottest Women of Reality TV. They have also appeared in spreads for Dillard's and in the 2006 film Deck the Halls. Britt can be seen in advertisements and on the walls of The Buckle stores. Kelly and Sabrina also starred together in a commercial for Acuvue contact lenses. Teddy can be seen in several Kohl's national print ads, as well as in New Found Glory's video "It's Not Your Fault" alongside Heide. Briana is a catalog model for Bebe and has been featured in JCPenney commercials.

Talesha is an aspiring singer, who has recorded her debut CD, Talesha's, a collection of R&B and hip-hop songs. Tracie Wright was a contestant in the RAW Diva Search 2004. She was the 5th diva eliminated after losing to current TNA Knockout and Former WWE Diva, Christy Hemme. Vinci is a contestant on VH1's Viva Hollywood!''.

Episodes

DVD

References

External links
 
 

2006 American television series debuts
2006 American television series endings
2000s American reality television series
English-language television shows
Modeling-themed reality television series
MTV reality television series
Television shows filmed in Miami
Television shows set in Miami